The Ctenopoda are an order of the superorder Diplostraca, comprising the three families Holopediidae, Pseudopenilidae, and Sididae. Its members mostly live in fresh water, but Penilia is marine.

References

External links

Arthropod suborders
Cladocera